The Six Days of Antwerp was a six-day track cycling race held annually in Antwerp, Belgium.

The Six Days has seen 55 editions, was organized from 1934 with interruptions during World War II and the years 1984 to 1986 and last held in 1994.

The Six Days of Antwerp was held at the Antwerp Sportpaleis in Merksem on a wooden indoor track, initially 132m long, after a reconstruction in 1968 it was given a length of 250m.

Record winner is Peter Post with 11 victories, five of them in consecutive years.

Winners

References

External links

Cycle races in Belgium
Six-day races
Recurring sporting events established in 1934
Recurring sporting events disestablished in 1994
1934 establishments in Belgium
1994 disestablishments in Belgium
Defunct cycling races in Belgium